Tomi Petrović (born 11 March 1999) is a Croatian footballer who plays as a forward for Italian  club Trento on loan from Pordenone.

Club career
He had spells in the Austrian lower leagues before moving to Italy. On 29 July 2019, Petrović joined Rimini on loan. On 15 January 2020, he moved on a new loan to Pro Vercelli.

On 8 January 2021, he was loaned to Lucchese. On 19 July 2021, he joined Lecco on loan.

On 30 June 2022, Serie C club Pordenone announced a signing of a three-year contract with Petrović. On 22 July 2022, he was loaned by Pontedera. On 17 January 2023, Petrović moved on a new loan to Trento.

Personal life
He is the son of retired footballer Vladimir Petrović.

References

External links
 
 

1999 births
Living people
Footballers from Toulouse
French people of Croatian descent
Association football forwards
Croatian footballers
French footballers
Kapfenberger SV players
Virtus Entella players
Rimini F.C. 1912 players
F.C. Pro Vercelli 1892 players
S.S.D. Lucchese 1905 players
Calcio Lecco 1912 players
Pordenone Calcio players
U.S. Città di Pontedera players
A.C. Trento 1921 players
Austrian Landesliga players
Austrian 2. Landesliga players
2. Liga (Austria) players
Serie B players
Serie C players
Croatian expatriate footballers
Expatriate footballers in Austria
Croatian expatriate sportspeople in Austria
Expatriate footballers in Italy
Croatian expatriate sportspeople in Italy